Pre-B-cell leukemia transcription factor 1 is a protein that in humans is encoded by the PBX1 gene.

Interactions 

PBX1 has been shown to interact with:
 HOXB1, 
 HOXB7,
 MEIS1,  and
 Prep1.

References

Further reading

External links 
 
 
 

Transcription factors